Rakshasudu is a 2019 Indian Telugu-language psychological thriller film directed by Ramesh Varma. The film stars Bellamkonda Sreenivas and Anupama Parameswaran and it is the official remake of the 2018 Tamil film Ratsasan. 

The music is composed by Ghibran, the film began production in March 2019. Movie was released on 2 August 2019. The film was a success at the box office.

Plot

Two elderly men discover the corpse of Samyuktha, a 15-year-old school student who was brutally murdered and wrapped in a polythene bag.

Arun Kumar is an aspiring filmmaker who wants to make a movie on psychopaths. After being rejected many times despite having a good script and due to pressure from his family, he decides to become a sub-inspector with the help of his brother-in-law, Prasad, a police officer himself. He moves in with his sister Sapna, Prasad, and their daughter Siri. Siri gets into trouble when she makes Arun forge her father's signature on her report card. Her class teacher Krishnaveni figures this out and thinks that she signed it herself. Siri brings Arun to her school to pretend to be her father. Later, when Siri is caught by her parents, they transfer her to another school. Arun then meets and befriends Krishnaveni and her niece Kavya, who is speech deprived.

A teenage schoolgirl named Amrutha is abducted on her way home. Her parents then find a mutilated doll's head in a gift box attached to their dog's collar. Arun finds a similarity between Samyuktha and Amrutha, both of them being 15-year-old school students who were kidnapped while returning from school. Just like Samyuktha, the hair on the doll's forehead is uprooted, the eyes are drilled, and her mouth is damaged. Apart from that, in particular, there is a knife mark on Samyuktha's forehead, ears and nasion. The same marks were found on the doll's face. He tries to convince ACP Lakshmi, his egotistical, superior officer, that this was a psychopath at work. However, his theories are brushed off as stories.

Later, Amrutha's brutally mutilated corpse is found. The killer drilled out her eyes, broke her teeth, and uprooted her hair in patches. On top of that, her body has stab wounds made while she was alive. Arun suggests the corpses be hidden to prevent the killer from gaining attention. Initially, the officials oppose this idea owing to breaking protocol, but they eventually move the bodies to a secret facility under Dr. Kishore. Soon after, another schoolgirl named Meera is abducted. She happened to be from Siri's former school. The search leads to a teacher named Somaraj, who works at Siri's current school and is revealed to be a pedophile preying on schoolgirls. Arun encounters Somaraj trying to molest Siri and beats him up before detaining him. Somaraj admits to being a sexual predator but denies having anything to do with the murders. In a bid to escape, he holds Venkat, a policeman, at gunpoint. Arun manages to gun Somaraj down inside the lift, thereby saving Venkat.

Meanwhile, Siri is abducted from her birthday party at home. Arun and Prasad discover her mutilated body in their car trunk, implying that she was also murdered. Things worsen for Arun, as he gets suspended for his negligence for shooting Somaraj. Dejected and angry, Arun investigates the case by himself, with the help of a few policemen. Finding an audio clip from the hearing aid of Meera, he traces it back to an elderly magician named Annabella George's performance at the victim's school function. The lady used her magic show as a ruse to kidnap the girls since she impressed all the students with her magic tricks. She invites one student to volunteer in an act and then interacts with the student to gain her trust. She stalks the selected student leading to their kidnapping the day after meeting them, without any hassle. This leads Arun to the next potential victim, a schoolgirl named Sanjana. Arun soon realises that he was following the wrong girl when he learns of Sanjana having a twin sister. Sanjana gets abducted, even though she was under surveillance. Arun tracks her location to a house in the city, where he narrowly saves Sanjana from being murdered. The perpetrator escapes, but is revealed to be Mary Fernandez, who was involved in a killing a long time ago. Arun finds more about the case from the investigating officer, Jaya Prakash, a retired cop.

Mary's son Christopher had been afflicted with Werner syndrome, a hormonal disorder that caused him to look aged. He was an outcast at school, but a girl named Sophie took pity on him and befriended him. Christopher soon began to develop feelings for Sophie, but unfortunately, he is heartbroken when she turns down his love and is ridiculed at school. The next day, Mary asked Sophie to become friends again and handed her a gift. When Sophie opens the gift box, she found a mutilated doll's head, which was what Sophie gave Christopher as his birthday gift. Sophie was brutally murdered by Mary, and both Mary and her son were arrested.

It is then revealed that both Mary and Christopher were in an accident, and she is still alive, murdering with the same vengeance. Jaya Prakash finds a clue in the files but is killed by Mary before meeting Arun. On being found at the scene of the crime, Arun is detained and kept handcuffed at the station. He discovers that Jaya Prakash was trying to reveal that the person who had been performing the magic show in the school had six fingers on the left hand, and by a piece of photo evidence, it is known that it was Christopher who has six fingers. Since only Mary died in the accident, the murderer is not the lady - it is her son Christopher, who has taken advantage of his aged appearance. Before Arun can act on this, Christopher attacks Krishnaveni and abducts Kavya. While trying to apprehend Christopher, Venkat is killed. Kavya escapes and is found by Kishore, who tries to hide her in the facility, but Kishore dies trying to protect her. Arun tracks down Christopher to the facility, and after a prolonged fight, manages to kill him and save Kavya.

The movie ends with the media reporting the chain of events and an end to the murders by the psychopath. It is then revealed that Arun gets a chance to make a movie about a psychopath, fulfilling his dream.

Cast

 Bellamkonda Sreenivas as Sub-inspector Arun Kumar
 Anupama Parameswaran as Krishnaveni 
 Saravanan as Christopher & Mary Fernandez/Annabella George (Dual Role)
 Yasar as Young Christopher
 Ammu Abhirami as Siri, Arun's niece
 Baby Dua as Kavya, Krishnaveni's niece
 Rajeev Kanakala as Prasad, Siri's father and Arun's brother-in-law
 Vinodhini as Padma, Siri's mother and Arun's sister
 Keshav Deepak as Venkat 
 Vinod Sagar as School Teacher Sobharaj 
 Suzane George as ACP Lakshmi
 Surya as Dr. Kishore 
 Kasi Viswanath as Police Constable Viswanath 
 Ravi Prakash as Police Officer Sravan
 Raghavi Renu as Sophie, Christopher's friend
 Raveena Daha as Sharmi, Siri's classmate
 Trishala as Sanjana & Sangeetha (Dual Role)
 Priya as Meera
 Radha Ravi as Inspector Jaya Prakash (cameo appearance)
Ghibran as himself (cameo appearance)
Noel Sean as himself (cameo appearance)

 Production 
The success of the film Ratsasan put high expectation amongst audiences. Due to this reason the remake rights price for this film went high. After the stiff competition, Koneru Satynarayana, the chairman of the educational university KL University Vijayawada bagged the Telugu remake rights of the film. The makers started this remake on Feb 2019 and completed it in June. This remake is directed by Ramesh Varma Penmetsa who has been previously directed films like Ride, Veera, etc., music by Ghibran and produced by Koneru Satynarayana under the production of A Studios Havish Koneru. This movie was distributed worldwide by famous producer Abhishek Nama under Abhishek Pictures.

 Music 

The film's score and soundtrack are composed by Ghibran and released on Aditya Music label.

 Release Rakshasudu was initially scheduled to release on 18 July 2019, but was pushed to August release. The film was released on 2 August 2019.

 Reception 
 Box office Rakshasudu collected 3.9 Crores gross and 2.3 Crores share worldwide on the opening day. In the first weekend movie collected 8.76 Crores gross and 5.48 Crores share in the Telugu speaking states (Andhra Pradesh & Telangana) and 13.6 Crores gross and 6.8 Crores share worldwide. In the first week movie collected 17.1 Crores gross and 9 Crores share worldwide.

 Critical response Rakshasudu positive reviews from audiences and critics,The Times of India gave 3.5 out of 5 stars stating "Rakshashudu keeps viewers on the edge of their seats. The screenplay is spot on and adds to the intrigue of watching the film and makes sure the suspense is impactful. Director Ramesh Varma avoids the temptation to over indulge. Bellamkonda puts in one of his best performances till date".Firstpost gave 3.5 out of 5 stars stating, "The biggest strength of Rakshasudu lies in its staging and how well-knit the whole narrative is. Editing by Amar Reddy is another major asset and there is hardly a boring moment in the film. For Sreenivas, film is a major shot in the arm and huge improvement compared to his recent performances".India Today gave 3 out of 5 stars stating "Bellamkonda Sai Sreenivas's Rakshasudu is a frame-to-frame remake of Tamil film Ratsasan. While the cop-thriller shows lazy film-making in parts, it still keeps you engrossed in the proceedings. Ghibran's haunting score, which speaks volumes".

Jeevi of Idlebrain.com gave 3 out of 5 stars stating, "Plus points are performances, story and screenplay. On the flipside, there is a bit of Tamil flavour (lacking Telugu nativity) in casting some of the actors and in some of the scenes. The dark approach of describing gruesome nature and killing techniques is not recommended for everybody".Great Andhra gave 3 out of 5 stars stating "Rakshasudu is Sreenivas's better act among all his movies. Musical background score by Ghibran and the sound design have actually elevated the movie. The sound is terrific. Production values are perfect".Sify gave 3 out of 5 stars stating "Rakshasudu'' is a fairly captivating serial-killer thriller with some edge of the seat moments. Aided by Ghibran's music and sound design, the film provides enough thrills".

Home media 
The Satellite and Digital rights of the film were sold to Gemini TV and Sun NXT for 6 Crores, and Hindi dubbing rights were sold for 12.5 Crores.

References

External links
 

2010s Telugu-language films
2019 action thriller films
2019 crime thriller films
2019 psychological thriller films
Indian action thriller films
Indian crime thriller films
Indian psychological thriller films
Telugu remakes of Tamil films
Indian police films
Indian serial killer films
Films about murder
Films about filmmaking
Fictional portrayals of the Telangana Police
2010s police films
2010s serial killer films
Films directed by Ramesh Varma